Osman Şirin (born November 5, 1943 in Vakfıkebir, Trabzon Province), is a high-ranked Turkish judge. He was a member of the Turkish Court of Cassation from 1991 to 2008, from 2004 as Deputy First President. On 5 November 2008, he retired from the Court.

External links 
  Osman Şirin at the official High Court of Appeals website

1943 births
People from Vakfıkebir
Turkish civil servants
Court of Cassation (Turkey) justices
Living people
Istanbul University Faculty of Law alumni